Culiacán, officially Culiacán Rosales, is a city in northwestern Mexico, the capital and largest city of both Culiacán Municipality and the state of Sinaloa. The city was founded on 29 September 1531 by the Spanish conquerors Lázaro de Cebreros and Nuño Beltrán de Guzmán under the name "Villa de San Miguel", referring to its patron saint, Michael the Archangel.

As of the 2020 INEGI census, Culiacán had an estimated population of 808,416, placing it as the 21st most populous city in Mexico, while its metropolitan area had a population of 1,003,530, being the 17th most populous metropolitan area in Mexico.

The city is in a valley on the slopes of the Sierra Madre Occidental, at the confluence of the Tamazula and Humaya Rivers, where both join to form the Culiacán River 55 m above sea level.

Etymology 
The genuine Aztec name of the Nahuatl language is Colhuacán or Culhuacán, which is from colhua or culhua and can, which is a place, and its meaning varies according to different historians:

 "snake place"
 "crooked hill"
 "where walkers twist the path"

The most respected theory is "place of the colhuas", that is "inhabited by the colhua tribe", and the most frequent meaning is "place of worshiping the god Coltzin".

History

Prehispanic era 
In ancient times, there was an indigenous settlement called Huey Colhuacan that dated back to Tecpatl, which corresponds to the year 628 CE. The Aztecs built it during their pilgrimage. Its exact location is unknown, but it is assumed that it was close to the current town of Culiacáncito. The ancient settlers were called Culichis.

Founding 
The city that we know today as Culiacán was co-founded in 1531 by conquistadors Lázaro de Cebreros and Nuño Beltrán de Guzmán under the name "Villa de San Miguel". Upon their arrival in the 16th century, the Spanish found the existence of farmhouses organized in indigenous nations by the tribe of the Tahues, which brought together a group of people of the same origin and language who had a common tradition.

Other indigenous peoples that inhabited the original territory of Culiacán were the Tebacas, Pacaxes, Sabaibo and Achires.

After their war of conquest, in 1531, de Cebreros and de Guzmán organized the territories acquired into three provinces. One of them was Culiacán, which was delimited to the South by the Elota River and to the North by the Mocorito River, depending on the Kingdom of Nueva Galicia. Organized in this way, the territory lasted until 1786, the year in which the administration system was implemented, with Sonora and Sinaloa forming the province of Arizpe and the older province of Culiacán remaining the same.

Independent Mexico 
On 6 October 1821, independence was sworn in Culiacán. Culiacán was granted the category of city, on 21 July 1823, when the provinces of Sonora and Sinaloa separated by decree from Congress. In 1824, by the Constitutive Act of the Mexican Federation, Sinaloa and Sonora met again, forming the state of the West. On 13 October 1830, the provinces of Sonora and Sinaloa were definitively separated by decree, with the city of Culiacán designated capital of the state of Sinaloa. In 1861, during the conservative government of the French Intervention, prefectures were installed and the Municipalities Law was decreed that divided the Districts into City Councils. The Badiraguato District was suppressed and became part of the Culiacán District as a municipality.

From 1859 to 1873, the capital of Sinaloa was moved from Culiacán to Mazatlán. In the Restored Republic, Governor Eustaquio Buelna confronted the merchants of the port. He returned to Culiacán and the Local Congress gave it the status of capital of the state.

Porfirian and revolutionary times 
In 1878, Culiacán had three City Halls, whose headwaters were Culiacán, Quilá and Badiraguato. It remained that way until 1880, when Badiraguato returned to being a district with the limits that previously corresponded to it.

The year 1912 was when municipalities were established by law as a new form of internal government, but it was not until 1915 that this law came into force and political directories were suppressed, causing the districts to become free municipalities.

Culiacán was established as a municipality by decree on 8 April 1915.

Sometime later, the State Congress approved the extension of the name of the capital city, giving it its current official name of Culiacán de Rosales. "Rosales" honors the great Mexican military man Antonio Rosales, who fought in the second French Intervention and the Reform War, along with serving as the governor of Sinaloa.

After World War II 

Beginning in the late 1950s, Culiacán became the birthplace of an incipient underground economy based on illicit drugs exported to the United States. The completion of the Pan-American Highway and the regional airport in the 1960s accelerated the expansion of workable distribution infrastructure for the enterprising few families that would later come to dominate the international drug cartels along Mexico's Pacific Northwest. The Sinaloa Cartel made Culiacán its primary base.

On 17 October 2019, after an ultimately unsuccessful attempt to arrest one of the cartel leaders, widespread gunfights broke out across the city, leading to multiple deaths, in what has been called the "Battle of Culiacán". One of Joaquín "El Chapo" Guzmán's relatives, Ovidio Guzmán, was arrested by police, but were forced to release him.

Coat of arms 

The coat of arms of the municipality and the city of Culiacán in Sinaloa, Mexico, has various elements that represent the history of the municipality yesterday and today.

Rolando Arjona Amábilis was the artist behind the official coat of arms of the Municipality of Culiacán, which was made official through municipal decree number 13 May 26, 1960 and published in number 90 of the Official Newspaper of the State of Sinaloa on 30 July 1960.

Its shape is square with rounded corners, ending in a point. The entire face of the shield is covered with a carmine color. In the center is a hieroglyph representing a hill with a human head inclined forward. This glyph alludes to Coltzin, "the crooked god", an authentic figure of Nahuatl mythology, who gave its name to the Nahuatlaca-Colhua tribe and, in turn, to the town of its residence, Colhuacán or Teocolhuacán.

Across the face of the shield, there are symbols of water referring to rivers. In the central part and towards the left side, a cross is followed by a path on which footprints can be observed that end in a small construction. These motifs symbolize the missionaries of San Miguel de Culiacán left for the North, and they are invoked as an obligatory tribute to the goodness and heroism of the missionaries.

On the carmine border, the word "Culiacán" can be read in its upper part, and in its lower part the word "Colhuacán", which corresponds to the true name of the place in the Nahuatl language. In the upper part of the shield, there is a hill with a germinating seed and the figure of a golden sun, alluding both to the tropical climate of this region and to the fundamentally agricultural effort of its inhabitants.

Politics 

The government of the municipality of Culiacán corresponds to its City Council, this is elected a universal, direct and secret vote for a period of three years that are not renewable for the immediate period but if not continuously and that begins to exercise its position on the day 1 January of the year following your election; The city council is integrated by the Municipal President into a Procurator Trustee and the body of councilors made up of 18 representatives, once they are elected by relative majority and seven by the principle of proportional representation.

Syndications 
For its internal regime, the municipality is subdivided into 17 receiverships, which in turn are divided into police stations, the 17 receiverships of the municipality are: El Salado, Higueras de Abuya, Baila, Aguaruto, Emiliano Zapata, Adolfo López Mateos (El Tamarindo), Jesús María, Las Tapias, Quilá, Sanalona, San Lorenzo, Tacuichamona, Tepuche, Imala, Costa Rica, Culiacáncito and Eldorado.

Paramunicipals 

 Culiacán Zoo
 JAPAC
 Municipal Institute of Sports and Physical Culture (IMDEC)
 EME Park (87)
 Municipal Institute of Culiacán Women (IMMUJERES)
 MIA Institute (MIA Museum & MIA Auditorium)
 Culiacán Municipal Institute of Culture (IMCC)
 Housing Institute
 DIF Culiacán
 The Chronicle of Culiacán
 Municipal Institute of Youth (IMJU)
 Municipal Commission of Populated Centers of Culiacán (COMUN)
 IMPLAN
 COMPAVI

Geography

Location 
Culiacán is located in the central region of the State of Sinaloa, forming part of the Northwest of Mexico. The coordinates that correspond to it are 24 ° 48'15 "N (latitude) by 107 ° 25'52" W (West), with an altitude of 54 meters above sea level.

From Culiacán to Tepic is only 502 km; to Durango, 536 km; to Hermosillo, 688 km; to Guadalajara, 708 km; to Monterrey, 1,118 km; to Chihuahua, 1,159 km; to Tijuana, 1,552 km; and to Matamoros, 1,434 km.

Relief and hydrography 

The relief of the municipality is well defined by a mountainous part and the coastal plain. The mountainous part corresponds to the physiographic region of the highlands, part of the Pacific slope of the Sierra Madre Occidental mountain range with elevations of 300 to 2,100 meters above sea level. The coastal plain lies to the West and is crossed by four regional rivers: the Humaya, Tamazula, Culiacán and San Lorenzo. The Humaya has its origin in the State of Durango, entering Sinaloa through Badiraguato; its waters are controlled by the Licenciado Adolfo López Mateos dam. The Tamazula River arises in the Sierra Madre Occidental near the Topia Valley; its waters are controlled by the Sanalona dam. The Humaya and Tamazula Rivers unite in front of the city of Culiacán to form the Culiacán River, which empties into the Gulf of California. The San Lorenzo is borne from the Sierra Madre Occidental within the State of Durango, enters Sinaloa through Cosalá and empties into the Gulf of California.

Climate 

It closely borders the tropical savannah climate (Köppen: Aw). Winters are much milder with less humidity and an average high of 27 °C, with warm nights.

Demographics

Population dynamics 

The Municipality of Culiacán has a total population of 858,638 inhabitants, this according to the 2010 Population and Housing Census carried out by the National Institute of Statistics and Geography (INEGI). It has a population density of 166.8 inhabitants / km2, the Municipality concentrates 31% of the population in the State of Sinaloa, with 422,507 men and 436,131 women, with a ratio of 96.9 men for every 100 women.

The city of Culiacán Rosales occupies only a part of the municipality of Culiacán and in 2010 had an urban area of 65 km2, being the largest in the state of Sinaloa and has a population of 675,773 inhabitants (of which 329,608 are men and 346,165 are women), according to the 2010 Population and Housing Census carried out by the (INEGI), resulting in a population density of 10,396.5 inhabitants / km2. concentrating 78.7% of the total urban population of the Municipality. The ethnic groups most represented in the Municipality are the Mixtec and Nahuatl, the total population of indigenous language speakers (HLI population) is 13,081 people. On the other hand, in the urban area of Culiacán, there are only 3,536 indigenous people, representing a very low percentage with respect to the total; Furthermore, these indigenous groups are not native to the municipality or the entity, since they were exterminated, displaced or assimilated by the mestizo population.

The city ranks 20th in number of foreign population, which amounts to 6,693 inhabitants, which represent almost 1% of the total population; Among the main nationalities we find Americans, Canadians, Spanish, Italians, Greeks, Argentines, Cubans, Colombians, Brazilians, Chinese, Japanese, Russians, Ukrainians, Venezuelans, Dominicans, Germans, among others.

The presence of people of Greek origin that occurred in the 1940s and 1950s coincided with the incipient but flourishing emergence of agriculture. This attracted a lot of Hellenic labor for the tillage of the land, and seeing that it was a profitable business, they communicated it to their family and friends. This attracted a greater number of people; today they have inherited a legacy to their children, grandchildren and great-grandchildren that make up the few thousand people who continue to live in the city. It is believed that the Greek community is the largest in Mexico and the best organized, the president of said community is in charge of Basilio Karamanos Pérez.

Housing and urbanism 

The total number of dwellings that exist in the city are 221,144 of which only 176,799 dwellings are occupied with an average of 3.81 inhabitants per inhabited dwelling. In general, cement roofs, walls and floors are used for the construction of the house, although homes or buildings do not cease to exist, most of them have sheet roofs and earth floors, this occurs mainly in the area peripheral to the south of the city, where the humble settlements of new inhabitants who arrive with the hope of obtaining a better quality of life proliferate.

Of the 176,799 occupied dwellings, 173,704 have electricity; 171,614 have piped water; 171,489 have drainage and 169,550 have the 3 services simultaneously.

The city has many buildings, among the most noteworthy are, Torre Tres Ríos, Torre Santa María, Torre Tres Afluencias, Mileto 4 Ríos, Estela Corporate Center, Ceiba, BioInnova Building, Tower 120 and Dafi, all located in one of the most important districts of the city, the Tres Ríos Urban Development.

City zoning 
The city is divided into different areas mainly:

The Historical Center of Culiacán is the original area of the city, in which most of the buildings of the Spanish colonization between the 16th and 19th centuries are found, it comprises a territorial extension of approximately 247,123 ha (2,471 km²). From the '70s onwards, there was a process of depopulation of the area due to the high costs of rents, the bustle of the main streets and avenues and the priority of having more commercial spaces, but in recent years there has been a process of repopulation of the same with the construction of apartments in the periphery of the Center and a project of urban reorganization in which it is intended to have a higher population density.

Las Colonias, which are the first settlements that were populating the perimeter around the original urban area by people from different social strata to have a largely wide space close to the Center; Among the best known and with the largest number of population we find: Infonavit Humaya, Tierra Blanca, 6 January, Stase, Juntas de Humaya, Almada, Miguel Alemán, Centro Sinaloa, Morelos, Palmito, El Barrio, Aurora, etc.

The subdivisions for their part are places divided by different construction companies, in which there are in certain sections, the same style of housing, housing people of lower middle class, middle and upper middle class, among the best known are: La Conquista, Villas del Rio, Valle Alto, Los Pinos, Villa Verde and Villa Fontana.

Residentials are considered to be areas strategically built for people with high purchasing power, with spacious houses, large green areas and in most cases, they are delimited as private, and we find: Tres Ríos, Chapultepec, Los Álamos, Guadalupe, Lomas de Guadalupe, Colinas de San Miguel, Montebello, La Campiña, Las Quintas, Isla Musalá and La Primavera.

Independent of these areas, we find one that stands out for its extension and its level of influence at the state level: the Tres Ríos Urban Development, which was started in 1990 with the aim of creating a better commercial, residential and entertainment area. for the city, in addition to taking advantage of the lands adjacent to the Culiacán, Humaya and Tamazula rivers, in addition to embellishing the banks with vegetation and a new boardwalk.

Parks and green areas 

The green areas are located in different areas of the city; In recent years, the municipal and state government have been concerned with protecting, safeguarding, and increasing green lungs, to provide a better quality of life for Culiacán and tourists; it has the following:

Las Riberas Park 

Parque Las Riberas (in Spanish) is the area attached to the Tamazula and Humaya rivers. Different species of trees such as willows, poplars, guamúchiles, and eucalyptus, can be seen. The White Bimodal bridge, which connects the park with the city center, facilitates access for pedestrians and at night it becomes a light show that contrasts with the Black Bridge in Culiacán.

Culiacán Botanical Garden 

Located to the east of the city, this area comprises 10 ha and is home to different ecosystems and hundreds of plant and tree species. The Culiacán Botanical Garden has a variety of more than 2,000 plants. It is known because here runners and cyclists choose to take the morning walk, the prohibition of dogs on the path of plants stands out. Many photographers flock to this garden to capture young quinceañeras and newlyweds.

Orabá Island 
Orabá Island, as its name indicates, is an island between the confluence of the Tamazula River and the Humaya River, where the Culiacán River is born. It is part of a series of parks and gardens that have been built on the banks of the three rivers. From very early on, many people come to exercise, walk, run, ride a bicycle or simply take a walk among the large trees.

Culiacán Zoo 
Located next to the heart of the city, forming part of the Civic Center Constitución with an extension of 13.5 hectares; which houses 1,400 animals belonging to more than 450 species including mammals, reptiles and birds. It was built on 14 December 1950, as part of the Development Plan of the Sinaloa State Government, which contemplated the need to create a natural area that would contribute to promoting the education of flora and fauna existing in this region under the mandate of the State Governor. General Gabriel Leyva Velásquez, supported by Emilio Aguerreverre, Municipal President of Culiacán.

Tres Ríos water park 
The Tres Ríos Water Park is a recreational space that was built at the confluence of the Humaya and Tamazula rivers, precisely where the Culiacán River is born.

This park is very close to Parque Las Riberas. It is the largest and most visited park in the northwest of the country.

This park is very visited thanks to its views of the Black Bridge and the Culiacán River.

Dancing fountains 
The dancing or dancing fountains of Culiacán are a spectacle of hundreds of independent fountains programmed to "dance" to the sound of typical Sinaloan music. This show is presented every day in an area of the 3 Ríos Project where the flagpole is located, more specifically, at the mere confluence of the Humaya and Tamazula rivers.

Park 87 
Located on Av. México 68, República Mexicana. The park has as attractions, slides, swimming pools, zip lines, the garden of peace.

Obregón Square 

Located on Álvaro Obregón Avenue.

Rosales Square 
Located next to the Rosalina house, which has diverse vegetation, it is a space with colonial architecture.

Economy
Culiacán's economy is mainly agricultural and commerce, being a trade center for produce, meat, and fish. Among other industries, Culiacán represents 32 percent of the state economy.

Coppel, Casa Ley, Homex and other companies of national importance are headquartered in Culiacán.

Administrative divisions

Culiacán is divided into 27 sectors (sectores), which are groups of several quarters (colonias):

Media
Newspapers El Debate and El Noroeste are published in Culiacán.

Education

Universities
 Centro de Estudios Universitarios Superiores (CEUS)
 Escuela Libre de Derecho de Sinaloa
 Instituto Tecnológico de Culiacán
 Instituto Tecnológico y de Estudios Superiores de Monterrey (ITESM) – Campus Sinaloa
 Instituto Tecnológico Superior de Sinaloa – Campus Culiacán
 Universidad Asia-Pacifico
 Universidad Autónoma de Durango-Campus Culiacán
 Universidad Autónoma de Sinaloa
 Universidad Casa Blanca
 Universidad Católica de Culiacán
 Universidad Golfo de México – Campus Culiacán
 Universidad México Internacional
 Universidad de Occidente – Campus Culiacán
 Universidad de San Miguel (USM)
 Universidad TecMilenio – Campus Culiacán
 Universidad Tecnológica de Sinaloa
 Universidad Valle del Bravo – Campus Culiacán
 Universidad de Veracruz – Campus Culiacán
 Universidad Tecnológica de Culiacán
 Instituto Chapultepec

Transportation
The Terminal de Autobuses de Culiacán or Central de Autobuses Culiacán Millenium is a bus terminal located west of the city of Culiacán, Sinaloa, Mexico. The station is built in front of the Country Club. This plant replaced the old plant that was to the south, in front of Blvd. Gabriel Leyva Solano.

Transit system

Urban transport
At present, Culiacán has just over 68 urban transport routes, which serve about one million users. The Culiacán urban transport is operated by RedPlus.

Rail
The city has a train station, operated by Ferromex, and it is used only to transport freight. It is connected to south with Mazatlán and north with Guaymas.

Bus station
Culiacán uses the Central Internacional de Autobuses "Millennium" ("Millennium" International Buses Station) to travel across all Mexico (north, central, and south) and to the United States (Arizona and California). This replaced the old bus terminal in the southern city.

Roads and expressways
Though several high-speed roads have been built, most of the city's streets are rather narrow and traffic jams are common at rush hours. Now, 300,000 cars are in Culiacán, making the per capita number of cars one of the highest in the country considering the 745,000 inhabitants.

Main roads
Culiacán has several roads (avenues, boulevards, streets, etc.), but some of these are the main quick connection to other points of the city.

 Álvaro Obregón Ave
 Francisco I. Madero Blvd.
 Paseo Niños Heroes
 El Dorado Ave
 Aeropuerto
 Emiliano Zapata Blvd.
 Benjamín Hill Ave
 Calzada de las Torres
 México 68
 Plan Mar de Cortes
 Heroico Colegio Militar
 Revolución Ave
 Sanalona Way
 Rolando Arjona Amabilis Blvd.
 Universitarios
 José Limón Blvd.
 Las Américas
 Diego Valadez Ríos
 Manuel J. Clouthier
 Miguel Hidalgo y Costilla
 José Vasconcelos
 Gabriel Leyva Solano Blvd.
 Xicoténcatl
 Josefa Ortíz de Domínguez
 Enrique Sanchez Alonso Blvd.
 De los Insurgentes
 Pedro Infante Blvd.
 Rotarismo Road
 Ciudades Hermanas
 Patria Ave
 Constituyentes Emiliano García
 Nicolás Bravo
 21 de Marzo Ave
 Las Minas

Bridges and tunnels
The city has a total of 13 bridges: six across the Tamazula River, two spanning the Humaya River, and the longest one with other four crossing the Culiacán River. Efforts to solve traffic problems have been made, but most of the city streets and bridges are now crowded and insufficient to handle regular and rush hours traffic; a 40-km/h speed limit in most parts of the city worsens the situation.

 Musalá Bridge (Tamazula River)
 Musalá-Universitaria Bridge (Tamazula River)
 Benito Juárez Bridge (Tamazula River)
 Morelos Bridge (Tamazula River)
 Miguel Hidalgo Bridge (Tamazula River)
 Juan de Dios Bátiz-Tres Ríos Bridge (Tamazula River)
 Josefa Ortíz de Domínguez Bridge (Humaya River)
 Rafael Buelna Bridge (Humaya River)
 Jorge Almada Bridge (Culiacán River)
 Black Rail Bridge (Culiacán River)
 Rolando Arjona Amabilis-UDO (Culiacán River)
 USE-Valle Alto (Culiacán River)
 Libramiento Recursos (Rosales Channel)
 Eje Federalismo Bridges (Rosales Channel)
 Chavez Castro Bridge (Rosales Channel)
 Emiliano Zapata Pass Bridge (Rosales Channel)

Also, Culiacán has bridges in streets conforming to high transit systems in places where the rush hour is common.
 Zapata (Blvd. Emiliano Zapata)
 280-Aeropuerto (Blvd. Aeropuerto)
 Eje Aeropuerto (Blvd. Aeropuerto-Emiliano Carranza street)
 Mexico 15 (Plan Mar de Cortes-Mexican Federal Highway 15)
 Primavera (Plan Mar de Cortes-La Primavera)
 Eje El Trébol (Plan Mar de Cortes-Blvd. Jesús Kumate)
 Eje Federalismo Tunnels (Gabriel Leyva Solano/Francisco I. Madero-Federalismo)
 UdO (Blvd. Rolando Arjona-Blvd. Lola Beltrán) under construction
 Gasolinera del Valle (Blvd. Jesús Kumate-Blvd. Emiliano Zapata) under construction
 Japac Country (Blvd. Pedro Infante-Blvd. Rolando Arjona) spring 2013

On 17 February 2014, investigators from Mexico and the United States learned that Joaquín Guzmán Loera, or El Chapo, was using underground sewage tunnels in Culiacán by constructing hatches connecting to the drainage network in the bathtubs of his city "stash houses".
On at least one occasion, authorities chased Guzman into the tunnels, but lost him. An AP reporter said some of the tunnels were well lit, had wood paneling, and were air-conditioned.

Highways and freeways
Culiacán is a rail junction and is located on the Panamerican Highway that runs north to the United States and south to Guadalajara and Mexico City, and the Benito Juárez Highway or Maxipista, which is a toll road that runs parallel to the toll-free federal highway. It is connected to the north with Los Mochis and to the south with Mazatlán, Tepic, and Guadalajara with the Federal Highway 15.
 Mexican Federal Highway 15 (north: Los Mochis, south: Mazatlán)
 Sanalona Free Highway (southeast: Sanalona (exit)/Cosalá)

Culiacán is linked to the satellite city of Navolato by an excellent freeway that now reaches Altata, in the Pacific Ocean coast. Culiacán is also linked to Tamazula de Victoria in Durango state.
 Freeway 280-30 (west: Navolato-Altata)
 Freeway 3-225 (north: Melchor Ocampo-Guamuchil)
 Freeway 5-325 (south: Costa Rica-El Dorado)
 Tamazula Interstate Freeway (northeast: Sanalona-Tamazula de Victoria)

Airport
Culiacán is served by Federal de Bachigualato International Airport , the most important domestic gateway in the state of Sinaloa, and the second in international operations after Mazatlán International Airport. It is located south of downtown; it is also the 10th Mexican Air Force base.

Entertainment

Tourism

 Imala's hot springs are about a 30-minute ride from the city and close to several dams and reservoirs, where one can fish largemouth bass all year round.
 Altata beach, located 30 minutes from Culiacán, has had extensive development over the last few years. It has a "sister" beach called Isla Cortés or Nuevo Altata, where this project of travel destination, has begun with some restaurants and private areas.
 Culiacán Cathedral, a 19th-century church, began construction in the 1830s.
 Plazuela Alvaro Obregón was the place for social gatherings in the 1800s.
 La Lomita or Templo de Nuestra Señora de Guadalupe is the tallest church in Culiacán, situated on a hill with a view of the entire city.
 The Centro Cultural Genaro Estrada, known by the locals as "Difocur", encompasses a theater, movie theater, a café, and a group of museums specializing in local culture. DIFOCUR is also the home of the Orquesta Sinfonica Sinaloa de las Artes. The OSSLA performs a 42-week season (September to June) of symphony, pops, opera, ballet, and chamber music, and features musicians from more than 15 countries, including Mexico, the United States, England, Scotland, Canada, Romania, Argentina, and others. Working under the auspices of the government of Sinaloa, the OSSLA also performs many outreach and educational programs around the state of Sinaloa, as well as throughout Mexico.
 The Regional History Museum in the "Parque Constitución", a large art museum downtown and a number of small art galleries, is owned by several of the local universities.
 The Botanical Garden and Centro de Ciencias de Sinaloa, a science museum, holds the fifth-largest meteorite on earth.
 A baseball stadium, the Estadio Angel Flores, is the home of Los Tomateros de Culiacán; a bigger football arena, called Estadio Banorte (formerly Estadio Carlos González), is the home of Los Dorados de Sinaloa, a Mexican football team. Several university stadiums are also available.
 In downtown, the best-preserved old street is the called Rosales, between Rosales Square and the cathedral.

Sports
The city is home to three professional league sport teams: baseball with the Tomateros de Culiacán from the Liga Mexicana del Pacífico, two championships in Caribbean series in 1996 and 2002; and football with Dorados de Sinaloa, who play at the Estadio Banorte (Estadio Carlos González) and basketball with the Caballeros de Culiacán from the CIBACOPA. Duck, dove, and goose hunting season goes from early November through March. Culiacán also holds a yearly international marathon.

Notable people from Culiacán

Entertainment
Yolanda Andrade, TV host
Ariel Camacho, singer
Luis Campos, drummer (Collinz Room, Noelia)
Cesar Millan, dog trainer
Paul Rodriguez, Hollywood actor and talk show host
Chalino Sánchez, Mexican singer
Sheyla Tadeo, actress and comedian

Sports
Irene Aldana (born 1988), mixed martial artist
Julio César Chávez, boxer with six world championships in three weight divisions
Julio César Chávez, Jr., former Middleweight champion
Omar Chávez, welterweight contender prospect
Óliver Pérez, Major League Baseball player
Alberto Medina, footballer
Jared Borgetti, footballer
Jorge Iván Estrada, footballer
Héctor Moreno, footballer
Gilberto Villarreal Solis, baseball player
Julio Urías, Major League Baseball player, World Series champion
Joey Meneses, Major League Baseball

Modeling
Paulina Flores Arias, Miss Mexico 2000, supermodel
Rosa María Ojeda, Miss Mexico 2006
Laura Elena Zuniga Huizar, Miss Mexico 2008, Miss Latinoamericana 2008, supermodel
Perla Judith Beltrán Acosta, Miss Mexico 2009, 2009 Miss World, Miss World top model

Crime
Benjamín Arellano Félix, Mexican drug lord, founder of Tijuana Cartel, older brother of Carlos Arellano Félix and Ramón Arellano Félix, and younger brother of Francisco Rafael Arellano Félix
Carlos Arellano Félix, Mexican drug lord and brother of Benjamín Arellano Félix, Francisco Rafael Arellano Félix and Ramón Arellano Félix
Francisco Rafael Arellano Félix, Mexican drug lord and older brother of Benjamín Arellano Félix, Carlos Arellano Félix and Ramón Arellano Félix
Ramón Arellano Félix, Mexican drug lord, founder of Tijuana Cartel and younger brother of Benjamín Arellano Félix, Carlos Arellano Félix and Francisco Rafael Arellano Félix
Miguel Ángel Félix Gallardo, Mexican drug lord, founder of Guadalajara Cartel
Joaquín "El Chapo" Guzmán, Mexican drug lord, lived here for some time before he was captured by the police

Gallery

See also

Aguaruto
Culiacáncito

References

External links

 H. Ayuntamiento de Culiacán — Official website
 Culiacán Travel Guide – Official website

 
Capitals of states of Mexico
Cities in Mexico
Populated places in Sinaloa
Populated places established in 1531
1531 establishments in New Spain
1530s establishments in Mexico